Alwyn Howard Gentry (January 6, 1945 – August 3, 1993) was an American botanist and plant collector, who made major contributions to the understanding of the vegetation of tropical forests.

Education

Gentry was born on January 6, 1945, in Clay Center, Kansas, and received his schooling at the Clay Center Community High School, from which he graduated in 1963. He graduated from Kansas State University in 1967 with a B.A. in physical science and a B.S. in botany and zoology. He earned his master's degree in 1969 at the University of Wisconsin–Madison as a student of botanist Hugh Iltis, with a thesis on the genus Tabebuia (Bignoniaceae) of Central America, a subject which he continued to study at Washington University in St. Louis, Missouri, from which he received his doctorate in 1972, with a Ph.D. thesis entitled An Eco-evolutionary Study of the Bignoniaceae of South Central America.

Career

Gentry spent his entire working career at the Missouri Botanical Garden, starting as an assistant curator in October 1972. In 1974, he made his first visit to Peru, a country that became the major focus of much of his subsequent work; he made his second trip there in 1976 and by the time of his death had visited the country 33 times. He also maintained his interest in the Bignoniaceae: he contributed treatments of the family to nine volumes, including the Flora of Panama, and had a further five in press when he died.

One of Gentry's major innovations was the use of transect samples as a tool for assessing the composition and structure of tropical forests, known as the Gentry Forest Transect. His method, allied to his encyclopedic knowledge of tropical plants, allowed him to sample a site in a matter of days, and over the course of his career he amassed data from over 200 such transects worldwide.

Because many of the plants which he encountered during his transect sampling were not flowering, Gentry developed the ability to identify species from vegetative specimens, not just from flowers and fruits, an ability that led to the publication of his Field Guide to the Families and Genera of Woody Plants of Northwest South America, completed just months before his death.

In 1990, Conservation International established a "Rapid Assessment Program" (RAP) to undertake quick assessments of areas deemed to be significant for conservation.

Gentry's transect method was well suited to such work and he became increasingly involved as a member of the RAP team.

Death
On August 3, 1993, Gentry was on a Rapid Assessment Program mission in western Ecuador, when the light aircraft in which he was traveling crashed into a mountain ridge near Guayaquil. Four people—the pilot, Gentry, American ornithologist Theodore A. Parker III, and Ecuadorian ecologist Eduardo Aspiazu—died in the crash; three other researchers including biologist Alfredo Luna Narváez survived.

Legacy
Gentry was prolific both as an author and as a plant collector: he published over 200 works and had many more on hand at the time of his death and he collected over 80,000 plant specimens, hundreds of which have proved to be species new to science.

Gentry and Parker are memorialized in the annual Parker/Gentry Award for Conservation Biology of the Field Museum of Natural History.

Several plant species have been named after Gentry, including: Acidocroton gentryi, Citharexylum gentryi, Crossothamnus gentryi, Eleutherodactylus gentryi, Hedyosmum gentryi, Metalepis gentryi, Palicourea gentryi, Phyllanthus gentryi, Sobralia gentryi and Zamia gentryi, as well as a bird, Herpsilochmus gentryi. In several instances, Gentry had been involved in the collection of the type specimens of these plants.

Honors
Marine Fellow, 1991: Pew Fellows Program in Conservation and the Environment
Distinguished Service Award, 1990: Society for Conservation Biology
Fellow, Linnean Society of London
Honorary Member, Sociedade Botanico de Brasil

Selected publications
Gentry, A.H., A. G. Forsyth. 1998. A Field Guide to the Families and Genera of Woody Plants of Northwest South America : (Colombia, Ecuador, Peru) : With Supplementary Notes (paperback). Conservation International, Washington, DC
Gentry, A.H., A. G. Forsyth, R. Vasquez (Illustrator),. 1996. A Field Guide to the Families and Genera of Woody Plants of Northwest South America : (Colombia, Ecuador, Peru) : With Supplementary Notes on Herbaceo. University of Chicago Press Hardcover
Gentry, A.H., A. G. Forsyth. 1993. A Field Guide to the Families and Genera of Woody Plants of Northwest South America : (Colombia, Ecuador, Peru). Conservation International, Washington, DC
Gentry, A.H. 1992. A synopsis of Bignoniaceae ethnobotany and economic botany. Annals of the Missouri Botanical Garden 21(3): 266-270
Gentry, A.H. 1992. Exarata (Bignoniaceae), a new genus from the Choco region of Ecuador and Columbia. Systematic Botany 17(3): 503
Gentry, A.H. 1992. Six new species of Bignoniaceae from upper Amazonia. Novon 2(2): 159
Gentry, A.H. 1992. Tropical forest biodiversity: Distributional pattern and their conservational significance. Oikos 63(1): 19
Gentry, A.H. and R. Ortiz. 1992. A new species of Aptandra (Olacacea) from Amazonian Peru. Novon 2(2): 153
Dodson, C.H. and A.H. Gentry. 1991. Biological extinction in western Ecuador. Annals of the Missouri Botanical Garden 78(2): 273
Faber-Langendoen, D. and A.H. Gentry. 1991. The structure and diversity of rain forests at Bajo Calima, Choco region, western Columbia. Biotropica 23(1): 2
Gentry, A.H. 1990. Four Neotropical Rainforests. Yale University Press, Branford. (627 pp)
Gentry, A. (1976). Bignoniaceae of Southern Central America: Distribution and Ecological Specificity. Biotropica, 8(2), 117-131. doi:10.2307/2989632

References

1945 births
1993 deaths
20th-century American botanists
Kansas State University alumni
University of Wisconsin–Madison College of Agricultural and Life Sciences alumni
Victims of aviation accidents or incidents in Ecuador
Victims of aviation accidents or incidents in 1993
Washington University in St. Louis alumni
Missouri Botanical Garden people
People from Clay Center, Kansas
Conservation biologists